In physics, the principle of relativity is the requirement that the equations describing the laws of physics have the same form in all admissible frames of reference.

For example, in the framework of special relativity the Maxwell equations have the same form in all inertial frames of reference. In the framework of general relativity the Maxwell equations or the Einstein field equations have the same form in arbitrary frames of reference.

Several principles of relativity have been successfully applied throughout science, whether implicitly (as in Newtonian mechanics) or explicitly (as in Albert Einstein's special relativity and general relativity).

Basic concepts

Certain principles of relativity have been widely assumed in most scientific disciplines. One of the most widespread is the belief that any law of nature should be the same at all times; and scientific investigations generally assume that laws of nature are the same regardless of the person measuring them. These sorts of principles have been incorporated into scientific inquiry at the most fundamental of levels.

Any principle of relativity prescribes a symmetry in natural law: that is, the laws must look the same to one observer as they do to another. According to a theoretical result called Noether's theorem, any such symmetry will also imply a conservation law alongside. For example, if two observers at different times see the same laws, then a quantity called energy will be conserved. In this light, relativity principles make testable predictions about how nature behaves.

Special principle of relativity

According to the first postulate of the special theory of relativity:

This postulate defines an inertial frame of reference.

The special principle of relativity states that physical laws should be the same in every inertial frame of reference, but that they may vary across non-inertial ones. This principle is used in both Newtonian mechanics and the theory of special relativity. Its influence in the latter is so strong that Max Planck named the theory after the principle.

The principle requires physical laws to be the same for any body moving at constant velocity as they are for a body at rest. A consequence is that an observer in an inertial reference frame cannot determine an absolute speed or direction of travel in space,  and may only speak of speed or direction relative to some other object.

The principle does not extend to non-inertial reference frames because those frames do not, in general experience, seem to abide by the same laws of physics. In classical physics, fictitious forces are used to describe acceleration in non-inertial reference frames.

In Newtonian mechanics

The special principle of relativity was first explicitly enunciated by Galileo Galilei in 1632 in his Dialogue Concerning the Two Chief World Systems, using the metaphor of Galileo's ship.

Newtonian mechanics added to the special principle several other concepts, including laws of motion, gravitation, and an assertion of an absolute time. When formulated in the context of these laws, the special principle of relativity states that the laws of mechanics are invariant under a Galilean transformation.

In special relativity

Joseph Larmor and Hendrik Lorentz discovered that Maxwell's equations, used in the theory of electromagnetism, were invariant only by a certain change of time and length units. This left some confusion among physicists, many of whom thought that a luminiferous aether was incompatible with the relativity principle, in the way it was defined by Henri Poincaré:

In their 1905 papers on electrodynamics, Henri Poincaré and Albert Einstein explained that with the Lorentz transformations the relativity principle holds perfectly. Einstein elevated the (special) principle of relativity to a postulate of the theory and derived the Lorentz transformations from this principle combined with the principle of the independence of the speed of light (in vacuum) from the motion of the source. These two principles were reconciled with each other by a re-examination of the fundamental meanings of space and time intervals.

The strength of special relativity lies in its use of simple, basic principles, including the invariance of the laws of physics under a shift of inertial reference frames and the invariance of the speed of light in vacuum. (See also: Lorentz covariance.)

It is possible to derive the form of the Lorentz transformations from the principle of relativity alone. Using only the isotropy of space and the symmetry implied by the principle of special relativity, one can show that the space-time transformations between inertial frames are either Galilean or Lorentzian. Whether the transformation is actually Galilean or Lorentzian must be determined with physical experiments. It is not possible to conclude that the speed of light c is invariant by mathematical logic alone. In the Lorentzian case, one can then obtain relativistic interval conservation and the constancy of the speed of light.

General principle of relativity
The general principle of relativity states:
That is, physical laws are the same in all reference frames—inertial or non-inertial. An accelerated charged particle might emit synchrotron radiation, though a particle at rest does not. If we consider now the same accelerated charged particle in its non-inertial rest frame, it emits radiation at rest.

Physics in non-inertial reference frames was historically treated by a coordinate transformation, first, to an inertial reference frame, performing the necessary calculations therein, and using another to return to the non-inertial reference frame. In most such situations, the same laws of physics can be used if certain predictable fictitious forces are added into consideration; an example is a uniformly rotating reference frame, which can be treated as an inertial reference frame if one adds a fictitious centrifugal force and Coriolis force into consideration.

The problems involved are not always so trivial. Special relativity predicts that an observer in an inertial reference frame does not see objects he would describe as moving faster than the speed of light. However, in the non-inertial reference frame of Earth, treating a spot on the Earth as a fixed point, the stars are observed to move in the sky, circling once about the Earth per day. Since the stars are light years away, this observation means that, in the non-inertial reference frame of the Earth, anybody who looks at the stars is seeing objects which appear, to them, to be moving faster than the speed of light.

Since non-inertial reference frames do not abide by the special principle of relativity, such situations are not self-contradictory.

General relativity

General relativity was developed by Einstein in the years 1907 - 1915.  General relativity postulates that the global Lorentz covariance of special relativity becomes a local Lorentz covariance in the presence of matter.  The presence of matter "curves" spacetime, and this curvature affects the path of free particles (and even the path of light).  General relativity uses the mathematics of differential geometry and tensors in order to describe gravitation as an effect of the geometry of spacetime.  Einstein based this new theory on the general principle of relativity, and he named the theory after the underlying principle.

See also

Background independence
Principle of uniformity
Principle of covariance
Equivalence principle
Preferred frame
Cosmic microwave background radiation
Special relativity including Introduction to special relativity
General relativity including Introduction to general relativity
Galilean relativity
List of important publications in physics: Relativity
Invariant
Conjugate diameters
Newton's Laws

Notes and references

Further reading
See the special relativity references and the general relativity references.

External links

 Wikibooks: Special Relativity
 Living Reviews in Relativity — An open access, peer-referred, solely online physics journal publishing invited reviews covering all areas of relativity research.
 MathPages - Reflections on Relativity — A complete online course on Relativity.
 Special Relativity Simulator
 A Relativity Tutorial at Caltech — A basic introduction to concepts of Special and General Relativity, as well as astrophysics.
 Relativity Gravity and Cosmology — A short course offered at MIT.
 Relativity in film clips and animations from the University of New South Wales.
Animation clip visualizing the effects of special relativity on fast moving objects.
Relativity Calculator - Learn Special Relativity Mathematics The mathematics of special relativity presented in as simple and comprehensive manner possible within philosophical and historical contexts.

Theory of relativity
Relativity